Joey Dosik is an American singer-songwriter and multi-instrumentalist based in Los Angeles, California. His most recent album, Inside Voice, was released in 2018.

Career 
Dosik grew up in Los Angeles, California. He started on piano at an early age. In his early teens he started on saxophone and was drawn to jazz and soul music. Influenced by alto saxophonist Arthur Blythe, he performed in the Los Angeles Leimert Park music scene which shaped his musical and cultural perspective on jazz. There he performed with veteran bassist Henry Grimes. He studied jazz and contemplative studies at the University of Michigan. In college he was a member of the Ann Arbor-based band Ella Riot.

In 2009 Dosik returned to Los Angeles and shifted his focus to singing and songwriting. He names Carole King, Sam Cooke and Marvin Gaye as musical influences. In 2012 he released his first solo EP titled Where Do They Come From?, and a second EP in 2016 titled Game Winner. He started performing as a solo artist and collaborating with funk band Vulfpeck.  His solo work received recognition from Leon Bridges and Quincy Jones. In 2018 he performed on the Jimmy Kimmel Show and released his first full-length album, Inside Voice. An album review characterized the music as pop-soul. The album features contributions by Moses Sumney and Miguel Atwood-Ferguson. On 18 May 2020 he released the single "23 Teardrops". He frequently performs with and has contributed to several albums by Vulfpeck.

Personal life
Dosik is a Los Angeles Lakers fan and plays basketball. He wrote "Game Winner", the title track of his 2016 EP, while recovering from a basketball-related ACL injury. The EP's theme merges his love for music and basketball. Before music, basketball was his first love.

Discography
Credits adapted from AllMusic and Bandcamp.

Studio albums

 Inside Voice (2018)

Extended plays
 Where Do They Come From? (2012)
 Game Winner (2016, reissue 2018)
Singles

 "Lakers Town (feat. Michael McBolton)" (2019)
 "23 Teardrops" (2020)
 "Emergency Landing (Live at United Recording)" (2020)

With others
 Dancethink (2009) with Ella Riot
 Vollmilch (2012) with Vulfpeck
 My First Car (2013) with Vulfpeck
 Thrill of the Arts (2015) with Vulfpeck
 The Beautiful Game (2016) with Vulfpeck
 Mr Finish Line (2017) with Vulfpeck
 Hill Climber (2018) with Vulfpeck
 Live at Madison Square Garden (2019) with Vulfpeck
Off Center (2019) with Scary Pockets
vol. 7 (2020) with stories
vol. 9 (2020) with stories
The Joy of Music, The Job of Real Estate (2020) with Vulfpeck
Hard Up (2021) with The Bamboos
Wong's Cafe (2022) with Cory Wong and Vulfpeck

References

External links
 

American male singer-songwriters
American soul musicians
American pop musicians
American multi-instrumentalists
21st-century multi-instrumentalists
Singers from Los Angeles
Living people
Year of birth missing (living people)
University of Michigan alumni
Singer-songwriters from California
Secretly Canadian artists
21st-century American male singers
21st-century American singers